The Stade Mayol is a multi-purpose stadium in Toulon, France.  It is currently used mostly for rugby union matches and is the home stadium of RC Toulonnais. The stadium is able to hold 17,500 people.
It is one of the few French stadiums to be embedded in the city and surrounded by high buildings. It was built at the foot of the Mont Faron, the hill on which Toulon is partly built, and overlooks the Toulon military harbour (La Rade) on the Mediterranean.

History
It is named after Félix Mayol, a very popular concert hall singer from Toulon who had succeeded in Paris in the early 20th century. A true-blue city boy, he offered to buy a piece of land for the club on which the stadium would be built. And so he did. He gave his personal money and gave up the rights on some of his songs to raise the rest. The least that could be done was to give the place the name of its generous patron.

It was inaugurated on March 28, 1920 by the mayor of Toulon and Félix Mayol himself. A cross-country race was organised, as well as a soccer match between Stade Raphaëlois from Saint-Raphaël and the RC Toulon football team (4-0) and a rugby match between RCT and TOEC from Toulouse (3-3).

All Blacks and Wallaby tourists played matches there against regional South-East selections.

Fans
The atmosphere is famous for a specific chant called Pilou pilou, created at the end of the 1940s by a club player, Marcel Bodrero, which describes the Toulon players as terrible primitive warriors coming down from the mountain towards the sea (exactly what Toulon's topography is). A cheerleader leads the chants and asks fans to answer and repeat the words. It generally comes up when players get on the pitch, then early in the game and  also when the team's forwards, the club's historical forte, start to dominate. The chant may also occasionally be heard after the game. The club president Mourad Boudjellal famously led the Pilou pilou after a Toulon home victory over Racing Métro in 2008 that secured Toulon's promotion to the Top 14.

References

Mayol
Mayol
Sport in Toulon
Multi-purpose stadiums in France
Sports venues in Var (department)
Buildings and structures in Toulon
Sports venues completed in 1920